The Wisconsin Department of Revenue (DOR) is an agency of the Wisconsin state government responsible for the administration of all tax laws, as well as valuing property and overseeing the wholesale distribution of alcoholic beverages and enforcement of liquor laws. The Department also administers the state's unclaimed property program and the state lottery.

The department headquarters are located at the State Revenue Building in south central Madison, Wisconsin.  The current Secretary of the Wisconsin Department of Revenue is Peter Barca.  He was appointed by Governor Tony Evers on January 8, 2019.

History

In the late 19th century, as the economy was shifting, Wisconsin's farmers began to raise concerns that the property-based tax system placed a disproportionate burden on them while many newer industries and corporations were able to escape taxation by hiding their property in other financial instruments.  Milwaukee attorney Kossuth Kent Kennan, then a tax attorney working for the Wisconsin Central Railroad, was the first to draft and propose a state tax commission to investigate and propose reforms to the taxation system.  Kennan convinced a legislator to introduce his proposal in the 1889 session of the Legislature, but it was not enacted.  Kennan continued his efforts for several more years, and, in 1897, when the last hurdle to passage was the Legislature's reluctance to appropriate $6,000 for the project, Kennan pledged to raise the money himself to fund his commission.  The bill passed as 1897 Wisconsin Act 340.

The first Wisconsin Tax Commission was a short-term study of existing tax policy.  Kennan, along with former congressman Burr W. Jones and attorney George Curtis, Jr., were charged with producing a report by the end of 1898.  The report laid out the inequities of the current system, substantiating the concerns of the farmers that other non-tangible forms of property were being taxed at a substantial discount, and that the entire system suffered from inconsistent valuation and irregular assessment.  They suggested that, in addition to reforms to tax law, the state required a new system of tax administration by trained, objective, non-elected state officials.

The Legislature responded to their report and the Tax Commission was reauthorized for another ten years, with a mandate to investigate and supervise the state taxation system (1899 Wisconsin Act 206).  Under the new Progressive Republican Governor Robert M. La Follette, who came into office two years later, the commission's mandate was considerably expanded to give them power over tax equalization in the state, and additional powers to enjoin local tax officials.  Finally, in 1905, the Tax Commission was made a permanent entity of state government, with three commissioners each appointed to eight-year terms.

In 1939, a major reorganization under Governor Julius P. Heil converted the previous three-member Tax Commission into a Department of Taxation headed by a single commissioner, while creating the separate entity known as the Wisconsin Tax Appeals Commission, now attached to the Wisconsin Department of Administration.

The Department of Revenue was created in 1967 from the previous Department of Taxation as part of the state government reorganization plan proposed by the "Kellett Commission," named for chairman William R. Kellett.

Organization

Leadership
The senior leadership of the Department consists of the Secretary, Deputy Secretary, and Assistant Deputy Secretary, along with the administrators heading up the divisions of the Department.
 Secretary: Peter W. Barca 
 Deputy Secretary: David Casey
 Assistant Deputy Secretary: Maria Guerra Lapacek
 State & Local Finance: John Dickert
 Income, Sales & Excise Tax: Diane Hardt
 Research & Policy: Robert Schmidt
 Enterprise Services: Julie Raes
 Lottery: Cindy Polzin
 Technology Services: Rick Offenbecher

Divisions

Office of the Secretary
Subdivisions include:
 Office of General Counsel
 Legislative Advisor
 Communications Advisor

State & Local Finance
The Division of State and Local Finance (SLF) is responsible for establishing the state's equalized values for property tax purposes.  They assess commercial, manufacturing, telecommunication, airport, railroad, and other special property, and provide financial management, training, and certification for municipal and county governments on administration of the state property tax policies.  In addition, they administer state shared revenue and property tax relief payments to local governments.

Subdivisions include:
 Equalization Bureau
 Local Government Services Bureau
 Manufacturing & Utility Bureau
 Office of Technical & Assessment Services

Income, Sales & Excise Tax
The Division of Income, Sales and Excise Tax (IS&E) administers individual income, employee withholding, corporate franchise/income, state and county sales/use, estate, excise, recycling, and other state tax programs.  It also administers various state tax credits, including the homestead, farmland preservation, earned income tax credits.  The Division works to promote voluntary tax compliance and to identify and address noncompliance, and to promote fairness and equity in the administration of state tax law.

Subdivisions include:
 Administration
 Office of Technical Services
 Office of Criminal Investigation
 Audit Bureau
 Compliance Bureau
 Customer Service Bureau
 Tax Operations Bureau

Research & Policy
The Research and Policy Division (R&P) provides analyses and reports of state fiscal and economic policies for the Secretary of Revenue, the Executive Office, and other state officials.  They provide assessments of current and proposed tax and revenue laws, and prepare revenue estimates for the development of the state budget.

Subdivisions include:
 Income Tax Policy Team
 Economic Team
 Sales and Property Tax Policy Team

Enterprise Services
The Division of Enterprise Services provides the Department with a wide range of support services, including administrative support, budget and financial management, business planning and performance measurement, printing, records management, personnel, affirmative action, employee development, employment relations, and management improvement studies.

Subdivisions include:
 Budget and Business Services Bureau
 Financial Management Services Bureau
 Human Resource Services Bureau

Lottery

The Division of Wisconsin Lottery is charged with the security and administration of the state lottery and related regulations.

Subdivisions include:
 Security & Operations Bureau
 Product Development & Marketing Bureau
 Retailer Relations & Sales Bureau
 Lottery Offices and Prize Redemption Centers

Technology Services
The Division of Technology Services provides technology services for the Department, including data collection and management, applications development and support, server and network support, workstation setup and support, and technology planning.  The division also manages information and technology standards, policies, and guidelines for the department to ensure information security and good stewardship of electronic resources.  

Subdivisions include:
 Customer Service Bureau
 Application Services Bureau

Statutory Commissions
Separate from the ordinary organizational structure of the Department, there are a number of specific commissions created by acts of the Wisconsin Legislature to oversee, advise, or administer certain functions.

 State Board of Assessors
 Farmland Advisory Council
 Investment and Local Impact Fund Board

Secretaries and Commissioners

Commissioners (1897–1939)

Commissioners (1939–1967)

Secretaries (1967–present)

See also
 Wisconsin Lottery
 Alcohol laws of Wisconsin

References

External links
 Wisconsin Department of Revenue
 Wisconsin e-file
 My Tax Account
 Wisconsin Lottery

State alcohol agencies of the United States
Revenue
Government agencies established in 1967
1967 establishments in Wisconsin